Tyrannides (New World suboscines) is a clade of passerine birds that are endemic of America. This group is divided into two clades (Furnariida and Tyrannida) that contain eleven families. The families listed here are those recognised by the International Ornithologists' Union (IOC).
 Pipridae: manakins
 Cotingidae: cotingas
 Tityridae: tityras, sharpbill, becards (includes Oxyruncus and Onychorhynchus)
 Tyrannidae: tyrant-flycatchers (includes Piprites, Platyrinchus, Tachuris and Rhynchocyclus)
 Melanopareiidae: crescent chests
 Conopophagidae: gnateaters and gnatpittas
 Thamnophilidae: antbirds
 Grallariidae: antpittas
 Rhinocryptidae: tapaculos
 Formicariidae: antthrushes
 Furnariidae: ovenbirds and woodcreepers (includes Dendrocolaptidae)

The cladogram below showing the family level phylogenetic relationships of the Tyrannides is based on a molecular genetic study by Carl Oliveros and collaborators published in 2019. The families and species numbers are from the list maintained by the International Ornithologists' Union (IOC).

References

Extant Paleogene first appearances
Bird infraorders